West Knapton is a small village in the Ryedale district of North Yorkshire, England. Until 1974 the village lay in the historic county boundaries of the East Riding of Yorkshire. It is situated on the edge of the Yorkshire Wolds at the foot of the North York Moors. The village is accessed by the A64. 
There are approximately 32 houses in the village itself with several outlying farms and the 'Knapton Maltings', a small development of houses. Also, a few houses are by the railway.

West Knapton hosts a gas-fired power station which is operated by Viking UK Gas Ltd on behalf of Scottish Power.

It also is host to Knapton Maltings, or Knapton Silo as it is locally known.

On the opposite side of the A64 to the village itself is the Wolds Way Caravan and Camping site.

West Knapton was served by Knapton railway station on the York to Scarborough Line between 1845 and 1930.

References

External links

Villages in North Yorkshire